Eduardo Fernandes Gomes Júnior (born 11 June 2001), known as Du Fernandes or just Eduardo, is a Brazilian footballer who plays as a midfielder for Mirassol.

Club career
Born in São José do Rio Preto, São Paulo, Du Fernandes joined Mirassol' youth setup in 2016, aged 15, after starting it out at a futsal team in his hometown. After impressing with the under-20s, he was promoted to the first team in July 2020, and made his professional team debut on 23 July, starting in a 0–0 Campeonato Paulista away draw against Água Santa.

After the arrival of Eduardo Baptista, Du Fernandes became a regular starter in the 2020 Série D, helping in the side's first-ever promotion as champions.

Career statistics

References

2001 births
Living people
People from São José do Rio Preto
Brazilian footballers
Association football midfielders
Campeonato Brasileiro Série C players
Campeonato Brasileiro Série D players
Mirassol Futebol Clube players
Footballers from São Paulo (state)